Chongqing Municipal Administration of Prisons (重庆市监狱管理局) is the prison service agency of Chongqing, a direct-controlled municipality in China. Its headquarters are in Yubei District.

Prisons

 Chongqing Women's Prison

References

External links
 Chongqing Municipal Administration of Prisons 

Government agencies with year of establishment missing
Municipal Administration of Prisons
Municipal Administration of Prisons
Provincial-level prison administrative bureaux in China